Pelican Lake is a lake in St. Louis County, Minnesota.

References

Lakes of Minnesota
Lakes of St. Louis County, Minnesota